Hier und Jetzt ("Here and Now") is the debut album by the German girl group Bisou. It was released via rapper Bushido's label ersguterjunge. He also produced and wrote the lyrics, together with Philippe Bühler.

Track listing 
 Oh Boy
 Nur du (Only You)
 Die Sonne geht auf (The Sun Rises)
 Die erste Träne (The First Tear)
 Püppchen (Little Doll)
 Nur ein Kuss (Just a Kiss)
 Ein neuer Tag (A New Day)
 Kein Turn (No Turn)
 Für dich (For You)
 Ultraschall (Ultrasound)
 Glamourgirl
 Wenn du (If You)

2007 debut albums
Bisou (band) albums